San Marino has recognized civil unions for both same-sex and opposite-sex couples since 5 December 2018. The law to permit civil unions became fully operational on 11 February 2019, following a number of further legal and administrative changes.

Cohabitation rights
On 17 June 2012, the Parliament passed a bill to allow foreign persons in same-sex relationships with San Marino citizens to stay in the country. The bill stops short of giving any rights to these couples (apart from immigration) but was regardless hailed as a historic step forward. Michele Pazzini, secretary of a San Marino LGBT association, said: "This is a little step towards the full recognition of same-sex couples." The bill was passed 33 to 20.

Civil unions

In March 2016, three parties announced their own proposals to create a new gender-neutral partnership law that would expand the rights of all unmarried cohabiting couples. The main coalition party (San Marino Common Good) ruled out adoption rights for same-sex couples, while an opposition party included them in their draft. The center-left coalition partner said that it was open to the idea of same-sex parenting and may bring the issue of stepchild adoption to a fourth proposal.

In December 2017, after winning the November 2016 election, the center-left coalition (consisting of United Left, Future Republic and Civic 10) committed itself to approving a civil union bill. A popular initiative to legalise civil unions was introduced to Parliament on 18 December 2017, and passed its first reading on 7 March 2018. Under the proposed law, couples (different-sex or same-sex) in civil unions would be able to access health benefits, pension rights and would have the same residency rights as married couples, among many other rights and benefits. The proposal was praised for going further than the Italian civil union law, approved in 2016, as it would allow for stepchild adoption. Additionally, children born during the civil union would be legally recognised as the children of both parents, and children born abroad would also be recognised.

A public consultation took place on 6 April 2018. The government indicated that it would try to have the initiative passed as soon as possible. On 27 September 2018, the Council Committee for Constitutional Affairs approved the bill by a 12–2 vote with some amendments; while now allowing for public ceremonies, the Committee conferred to the unions only a limited set of rights pertaining to marriage (residency, citizenship, pension rights, healthcare, succession rights, and stepchild adoption rights).

On 15 November 2018, the Grand Council approved the bill at the second and final reading by 40 to 4 votes in favour with 4 abstentions. The law was published in the Official Bulletin on 20 November 2018 and entered into force on 5 December 2018, but was not yet fully implemented, with director of the Civil Status Lorella Stefanelli stating that February 2019 was a likely date for commencement, pending a delegated decree adding the necessary legal basis and a series of administrative adjustments. In February 2019, Guerrino Zanotti, member of the Grand and General Council and Secretary of State for Internal Affairs, stated that the delegated decree would be adopted by the Congress of State within a few days, allowing the Civil Status to implement the new law. The decree was ratified on 11 February 2019. On 25 February 2019, the first civil union ceremony took place between Emanuele Leuzzi and Marco Cervellini, who had submitted a request on 12 February.

On 24 June 2021, a law came into effect making clear that all laws and regulations referring to marriage, married couples, and spouses, apply equally to partners in a civil union.

Statistics
In 2019, 36 civil unions were performed in San Marino, of which 13 were between same-sex couples.

Same-sex marriage
In April 2014, a Sammarinese man married in London filed a petition to start a debate on the recognition of foreign same-sex marriages in San Marino. On 19 September 2014, Parliament debated and rejected the proposed changes on a vote of 35–15. On 8 April 2015, the same man attempted to register his marriage in the country.

In December 2017, the Parliament approved, 25 votes in favor to 20 against, an amendment to a proposed 2018 budget law that would allow same-sex marriages for foreigners. Sammarinese couples, however, will still be banned from marrying. This was done with the aim of encouraging tourism. The government now has the task of drafting legislation to implement the amendment.

In November 2019, during the country's third Universal Periodic Review held by the United Nations Human Rights Committee (UNHRC), the Netherlands recommended that San Marino legalize same-sex marriage. The government "noted" (rejected) this recommendation.

Public opinion
A 2016 survey by La Tribuna Sammarinese found that 78% of Sammarinese were in favour of same-sex civil unions.

See also

LGBT rights in San Marino
Recognition of same-sex unions in Europe

References

LGBT rights in San Marino
San Marino